Stichodactyla haddoni, commonly known as Haddon's sea anemone, is a species of sea anemone belonging to the family Stichodactylidae. It is found in the Indo-Pacific area.

Description
S. haddoni is characterized by a folded oral disc that reaches between 50 and 80 cm in diameter with a 1 – 2 cm tentacle free oral area. The tentacles have a rounded tip and the end may be green, yellow, gray, or rarely, blue and pink. The column, external structure of an anemone visible when the animal is closed, has small, non-adhesive bumps (verrucae) which are usually the same color as the column and not visible. The tentacles are yellowish or tan.  At the circumference it has alternating short and long tentacles.

Distribution and habitat
S. haddoni is found on sandy surfaces and is widespread throughout the tropical and subtropical waters of the Indo-Pacific area from Mauritius to Fiji and from the Ryukyu Islands of southern Japan to Australia.

Biology
S. haddoni feeds in two ways. The first is internal via photosynthesis of its symbiotic zooxanthellae, living in its tissues. And the second is through capturing its prey via its tentacles that allow it to immobilize its prey (small invertebrates, fry or juvenile fish), by using toxins such as SHTX.

S. haddoni lives in association with 6 different species of clownfish :
Amphiprion akindynos (Barrier reef anemonefish)
A. chrysogaster (Mauritian anemonefish)
A. chrysopterus (Orange-fin anemonefish)
A. clarkii (Clark's anemonefish)
A. polymnus (Saddleback anemonefish)
A. sebae (Sebae anemonefish)

Juvenile Dascyllus trimaculatus also associate with S. haddoni. A number of other species are associated with S. haddoni, however the relationship is commensal rather than mutual as the anemone does not appear to benefit from the association. These species are
 Neopetrolisthes maculatus, a porcelain crab
 Shrimp from the genus Periclimenes
 Thor amboinensis, the squat or sexy shrimp

Gallery
Anemonefish in S. haddoni

References

External links

 

Stichodactylidae
Animals described in 1893
Taxa named by William Saville-Kent